The Uganda Bureau of Statistics ("UBOS") is an agency of the Ugandan government. Formed by the Uganda Bureau of Statistics Act, 1998, the agency is mandated to "coordinate, monitor and supervise Uganda's National Statistical System".

Location
The headquarters of UBOS are located in Statistics House, at Plot 9 Colville Street on Nakasero Hill, in Kampala, Uganda's capital and largest city. This is at the corner of Colville Street and Nile Avenue. The coordinates of Statistics House are 0°18'58.0"N, 32°35'05.0"E (Latitude:0.316111; Longitude:32.584722).

Overview
The agency is supervised by the Uganda Ministry of Finance, Planning and Economic Development. UBOS is governed by a seven-person board of directors. Its scope of work includes conducting a national population census at least once every 10 years or so. The last national census was conducted in August 2014. The exercise cost an estimated UGX:75 billion and created an estimated 150,000 temporary jobs. The agency also publishes regular economic surveys and forecasts, including the monthly inflation figures for the country.

See also
 Bank of Uganda
 Uganda Revenue Authority
 Economy of Uganda

References

External links
Website of Uganda Bureau of Statistics

Government agencies of Uganda
Economy of Uganda
Organizations established in 1998
Organisations based in Kampala
1998 establishments in Uganda
National statistical services